Susan "Sue" Habernigg (born c. 1964) is a retired American swimmer who won a silver medal in the  freestyle relay at the 1982 World Aquatics Championships. 

She graduated from the University of Southern California. In 1981, she set an Oregon School Activities Association (OSAA) meet records in the 50-yard freestyle that stood until 2010 – the longest-held record in the OSAA history.

See also
 List of World Aquatics Championships medalists in swimming (women)

References

1964 births
Living people
American female freestyle swimmers
Swimmers from Oregon
USC Trojans women's swimmers
World Aquatics Championships medalists in swimming